Store Lungegårdsvannet is a bay located in the city and municipality of Bergen in Vestland county, Norway. The bay separates the city centre, located in the borough of Bergenhus, from the southern boroughs of the city, Årstad, Fana and Ytrebygda. The bay is situated at the end of the Puddefjorden.

History
The bay is named after the farm of Lungegården, the estate of the Danish nobleman Vincens Lunge. In the Middle Ages, the bay was named Alrekstadvågen, after the royal farm of Alrekstad. Historically, the lake Lille Lungegårdsvannet was located just northwest of the bay, and it emptied into the bay. In the 1930s, the bay, and the area surrounding it, was an attractive recreation area for the inhabitants of the city, with boat harbours and beaches. Starting in the 1950s, the bay was seen as a resource for the city to cover the acute need for free, unused land. As a result, several large parts of the bay, mainly on the northern shore, have been filled in, so much so that there is no longer any connection between this bay and the lake Lille Lungegårdsvannet. The Nygård Bridge crosses the western end of the bay, as the water flows into the Puddefjorden.

Commerce
It has a marina.

References

Fjords of Vestland
Geography of Bergen